Ousmane Ba (born 6 June 2002) is a Senegalese professional footballer who plays as a goalkeeper for Ligue 2 club Metz.

Club career
Ba is a youth product of the Senegalese youth academy Génération Foot. 

On 16 September 2020, he joined Metz B. 

On 7 October 2020, he signed a contract until 2025 with Metz.

International career
Ba made his debut for the Senegal U-23 in a 4-0 won against Morocco U-23 on 22 September 2022.

References

External links
 

2002 births
Living people
People from Rufisque
Senegalese footballers
Senegal youth international footballers
Association football goalkeepers
FC Metz players
Ligue 2 players
Championnat National 2 players
Senegalese expatriate footballers
Senegalese expatriates in France
Expatriate footballers in France